WKDP (1330 AM) is a radio station  broadcasting a Talk format. Licensed to Corbin, Kentucky, United States.  The station is currently owned by Eubanks Broadcasting, Inc.

History
As of 1989, WKDP broadcast a country music format. By 1991, it had split from its shared format with its FM sister and began broadcasting oldies.

References

External links

KDP
Corbin, Kentucky